The 1956–57 UCLA Bruins men's basketball team represented the University of California, Los Angeles during the 1956–57 NCAA University Division men's basketball season and were members of the Pacific Coast Conference. The Bruins were led by ninth year head coach John Wooden. They finished the regular season with a record of 22–4 and finished second in the PCC with a record of 13–3.

Previous season

The Bruins finished the regular season with a record of 22–6 and won the PCC regular season championship with a record of 16–0. The victory over Seattle was UCLA's first victory in the NCAA tournament.

Roster

Schedule

|-
!colspan=9 style=|Regular Season

Source

References

UCLA Bruins men's basketball seasons
Ucla
UCLA Bruins Basketball
UCLA Bruins Basketball